Chung Mong-hong (born 1965), also known by his pseudonym, Nagao Nakashima (or in ), is a Taiwanese film director, screenwriter and cinematographer.

Career 
Chung received Golden Horse Award for Best Director for his film The Fourth Portrait in 2010 at the 47th Golden Horse Awards. His film Soul was selected as the Taiwanese entry for the Best Foreign Language Film at the 86th Academy Awards, but was not nominated.  He won the Golden Horse Award for Best Director and Best Feature at the 56th Golden Horse Awards for his film A Sun in 2019.

Chung originally used the pseudonym "Nagao Nakashima" in Parking after he took over the role of cinematographer following the previous one "abruptly quitting". He continued to use the name to credit himself separately as the director or photography in all the films he directed up to The Falls, where he credited himself in the role using his actual name.

Filmography

Director

Features 
 2008 : Parking (停車)
 2010 : The Fourth Portrait (第四張畫)
 2013 : Soul (失魂)
 2016 : Godspeed (一路順風)
 2019 : A Sun (陽光普照)
 2021 : The Falls (瀑布)

Documentaries 
 2006 : Doctor (醫生)

Cinematographer and producer 
 2017 : The Great Buddha + (大佛普拉斯)
 2020 : Classmates Minus (同學麥娜絲)
 2020 : A Leg (腿)

References

External links
 

1965 births
Living people
Taiwanese film directors
Taiwanese screenwriters
Taiwanese people of Hakka descent
Taiwanese cinematographers